The Alberta Métis Federation (AMF) is an umbrella group founded in February 2020 represented by six local Métis communities in Alberta that had separated from the Métis Nation of Alberta (MNA). The AMF is a decentralized body led by the presidents of its member organizations, called "Metis community associations". A seventh local community organization representing Edmonton was founded after the creation of the AMF.

The creation of the AMF occurred the same month that the Fort McKay Métis Community Association was recognized by the Government of Alberta as the rightful representative of that community's indigenous rights, over the objections of the MNA, which claims to speak for all Metis in Alberta.

, the member nations of the AMF are:
  Fort McKay Métis Community Association, Fort McKay
  Willow Lake Métis Nation, Anzac
  Edmonton Métis Community Association, Edmonton
  Athabasca Landing Métis Community Association, Athabasca
  Owl River Métis Community Association, Lac la Biche
  Lakeland Métis Community Association, Plamondon
  Chard Métis Community Association, Janvier

Since July 2021, the Alberta Métis Federation has been recognized by the Manitoba Metis Federation, which is in a dispute with the other provincial member of the Metis National Council.

References 

Métis in Alberta
Métis organizations
2020 establishments in Alberta